The Celtic Football Club, commonly called the Jersey City Celtics, was an American soccer club based in Jersey City, New Jersey. The club was organized in the summer of 1921 to be an inaugural member of the professional American Soccer League. The club folded after five games.

History
The owners of Celtics put over $6,000 into establishing their team which played in a baseball stadium.  In July 1921, they played Third Lanark in preparation for the upcoming season.  After losing its first five games, the ownership withdrew the team from the league, dissolved it, and forfeited its franchise in early December.

Year-by-year

Roster

Notes and references
Bibliography

Footnotes

External links
 The Year in American Soccer - 1922

Defunct soccer clubs in New Jersey
American Soccer League (1921–1933) teams
Sports in Hudson County, New Jersey
1921 establishments in New Jersey
1921 disestablishments in New Jersey
Association football clubs established in 1921
Association football clubs disestablished in 1921